Hiland may refer to:

 Hiland (given name), including list of people with the name
 Hiland, Wyoming
 J. Cody Hiland, American attorney
 Johnny Hiland (born 1975), American musician